Heather Bergsma (née Richardson; born March 20, 1989) is an American former speed skater who competed between 2006 and 2020.

Career
Bergsma is a native of North Carolina. She represented the United States at the 2010 Winter Olympics in Vancouver, where she finished 6th in 500 metres, 9th in the 1000 metres, and 16th in the 1500 metres. At the 2011 World Single Distance Championships in Inzell, Germany, she won a bronze medal in the 1000 metres. She also placed 8th in the 500 metres, and was part of the team pursuit team that finished in 8th place.

On January 26–27, 2013, Bergsma won the gold medal at the 2013 World Sprint Championships in Salt Lake City, United States. She has since won several world championship medals, and earned numerous podium placings in the World Cup. In 2018 she won a bronze medal in pyeongchang.

Bergsma is the current world record holder in the 2 x 500 meters and the current American record holder on the 500 metres distance. She held the 1500 metres world record from 2015 to 2019, and also briefly held the 1000 metres world record in November 2015, and the sprint combination world record from 2013 to 2017.

She announced her retirement from skating in February 2020.

Personal life
Bergsma married Dutch speed skater and marathon skater Jorrit Bergsma in May 2015, and competed as Heather Richardson-Bergsma the following season.

Speed skating

Records

Personal records

World records

Results timeline

Note: NC = No classification.

References

External links
 
 
 
 
 
 

1989 births
American female speed skaters
Sportspeople from High Point, North Carolina
Speed skaters at the 2010 Winter Olympics
Speed skaters at the 2014 Winter Olympics
Speed skaters at the 2018 Winter Olympics
Living people
Medalists at the 2018 Winter Olympics
Olympic bronze medalists for the United States in speed skating
World Single Distances Speed Skating Championships medalists
World Sprint Speed Skating Championships medalists
21st-century American women